Scampolo is a 1928 German silent comedy film directed by Augusto Genina and starring Carmen Boni, Livio Pavanelli and Hans Junkermann. The film featured an early appearance from the future star Anna Magnani. The story of Scampolo, a fictional street child from Rome, has been made into several films.

It was made by the Berlin-based production company Nero Film. The film's sets were designed by the art directors Otto Erdmann and Hans Sohnle.

Cast
 Carmen Boni as Scampolo, römisches Bettelmädchen  
 Livio Pavanelli as Tito Sacchi, Ingenieur  
 Hans Junkermann as Bertini, sein Freund  
 Lya Christy as Lia Bertini, seine Frau  
 Carla Bartheel as Franka  
 Max Schreck as Ein Kellner 
 Carl Goetz as Professor Giglioli  
 Karl Platen as Hotelportier  
 Mary Kid
 Anna Magnani

See also
 Scampolo (1932)
 Scampolo (1958)

References

Bibliography
 Teresa Viziano Fenzi & Gastone Bosio. Anna Magnani: una voce umana. Titivillus, 2008.

External links

1928 films
Films of the Weimar Republic
German silent feature films
German comedy films
1928 comedy films
Films directed by Augusto Genina
Films set in Rome
Films produced by Seymour Nebenzal
National Film films
German black-and-white films
1920s German-language films
Silent comedy films
1920s German films